Jason Jaskirat Singh Sangha (born 8 September 1999) is an Australian cricketer. He is a right-handed batsman and right-arm leg break bowler. He represents New South Wales and Randwick Petersham in NSW Premier Grade Cricket.

Sanga was born in Sydney and grew up in Newcastle, then at the age of 17 moved to Sydney to play grade cricket for Randwick Petersham Cricket Club. He made his List A debut for Cricket Australia XI against South Australia on 15 October 2016. He made his first-class debut for Cricket Australia XI against England on 8 November 2017 in a tour game prior to the 2017–18 Ashes series. He scored his maiden first-class century in the second tour match, becoming the second-youngest player to score a first-class century against England, second to only Sachin Tendulkar.

In December 2017, he was named as the captain of Australia's squad for the 2018 Under-19 Cricket World Cup. He was the leading run-scorer for Australia in the tournament, with 229 runs.

In December 2022, he was named as the captain of the Sydney Thunder, replacing Usman Khawaja.

References

External links

Jason Sangha at Cricket Australia

1999 births
Living people
Australian cricketers
New South Wales cricketers
Cricketers from Sydney
Cricket Australia XI cricketers
Sydney Thunder cricketers
Australian sportspeople of Indian descent
Australian people of Punjabi descent